XED-AM (1050 kHz) is a commercial AM radio station in Mexicali, Baja California, also heard in the Yuma, Arizona and El Centro, California radio markets. It is owned by Radiorama and simulcasts its XHMUG-FM 96.9 "La Poderosa". Prior to being a simulcast of XHMUG, it was known as "La Gran D" or "The Big D".

Because AM 1050 is a clear channel frequency reserved for XEG in Monterrey, Nuevo León, XED must greatly reduce power at night to avoid interference; it was a daytime-only radio station for nearly seven decades.

History

Prior to the sign-on of XED in Mexicali, the call sign belonged to perhaps the first radio station in Mexico to be considered a border blaster. The first XED was located at Reynosa, Tamaulipas, and was under the advertising sales management of the International Broadcasting Company. Located across the Rio Grande River (Río Bravo) from McAllen, Texas, USA, the station broadcast with a power of 10,000 watts (10 kW) which was the most powerful transmitter in Mexico at that time.

The current XED received its concession in May 1947. After nearly 70 years of daytime-only operation, XED began broadcasting at night with 200 watts in the summer of 2016. This is the first time it has operated legally at night, as American station KTCT, which also operates on 1050 in the San Francisco Bay Area, has accused XED of operating illegally at night at more than its licensed daytime transmitter power, and has received FCC permission to broadcast at its regular daytime 50,000 watt power at night to overcome XED's interference. On June 2, 2019, at midnight, XED ceased operations.

XED returned on September 29, 2019, as part of a simulcast with XHMUG-FM 96.9.

References
"Wolfman Jack's old station howling once again." – Dallas Times Herald, January 2, 1983. – primarily about XERF but it also includes background information on the border-blasters.
Border Radio, by Fowler, Gene and Crawford, Bill.  Texas Monthly Press, Austin. 1987 
Mass Media Moments in the United Kingdom, the USSR and the USA, by Gilder, Eric. – "Lucian Blaga" University of Sibiu Press, Romania. 2003

External links

Radio stations in Mexicali
Radio stations established in 1947
1947 establishments in Mexico